Drecelj is a village in the municipalities of Sokolac (Republika Srpska) and Olovo, Bosnia and Herzegovina.

Demographics 
According to the 2013 census, its population was just 1, a Bosniak living in the Olovo part with no people living in the Sokolac part.

References

Populated places in Olovo
Populated places in Sokolac